Hollis McLaren (born February 5, 1956) is a Canadian film and television actress.

Early life and education 
McLaren was born in Toronto in 1956. She earned a Bachelor of Arts degree from the University of Windsor and studied drama at RADA in London.

Career 
McLaren is best known for her role in the 1977 cult film Outrageous! and its sequel Too Outrageous!, in which she played a character closely based on writer Margaret Gibson. She also had roles in the films Sudden Fury, Partners, Atlantic City, Jigsaw (L'Homme en colère) and Marion Bridge, as well as the television series Pit Pony and the television film Mom at Sixteen.

She was a Canadian Film Award nominee for Best Actress in 1977 for Outrageous!.

Filmography

Film

Television

References

External links
 

Living people
1956 births
Canadian television actresses
Canadian film actresses
Actresses from Toronto

University of Windsor alumni